Bradley Thomas Gerstner (born May 4, 1971) is an American investor and hedge fund manager. He is Founder, Chairman and CEO of Altimeter Capital. Gerstner appeared on the 2022 Forbes Midas List after his firm's successful investments in Snowflake and Grab.

Early life
Gerstner was born on May 4, 1971 in Goshen, a city in Elkhart County, Indiana. His father was Thomas Gerstner and his mother was Martha Burt.

He attended Wabash College from 1989 to 1993 and graduated summa cum laude with a bachelor's degree in Economics and Political Science. He also studied abroad at the University of Oxford from 1991 to 1992. 

From 1993 to 1996, Gerstner attended Indiana University Maurer School of Law and obtained a Juris Doctor degree. He did day trading to help pay for his law school fees. After graduation he practiced securities law as a lawyer at Ice Miller LLP and served a term as Deputy Secretary of State of Indiana.

In 1999, Gerstner returned to school and attended Harvard Business school where he graduated in 2000 with a Master of Business Administration degree. After graduating, Gerstner was a founding principal of General Catalyst, worked at several travel website startups and then worked as a Portfolio Manager for PAR Capital from 2005 to 2008.

Altimeter Capital 
In 2008, Brad Gerstner founded Altimeter Capital in Boston, Massachusetts.  It was launched with less than $3 million from Gerstner's friends and family during the financial crisis of 2008. 

In January 2016, Gerstner and the firm fought with United Continental Holdings to change the company's board of directors. Gerstner put out a statement that stated investors were very disappointed with the poor performance and decision making of the company in recent years. United Continental Holdings eventually gave in and changed its board of directors.

In October 2022, Gerstner wrote an open letter to Meta and its CEO, Mark Zuckerberg. In the letter, Gerstner criticized the company stating it had too many employees and was moving too slowly to retain investor confidence. He recommended reducing the headcount expense by 20% and limiting Metaverse investments to $5 billion per year. A few weeks later, Meta laid off over 11,000 employees.

Personal life 

Gerstner married Michelle Boyers on September 30, 2007 at Martha's Vineyard. The two of them met at Harvard Business School. 

Gerstner is an amateur pilot.

References

1971 births
Living people
American hedge fund managers
American money managers
Harvard Business School alumni
Indiana lawyers
Indiana University Maurer School of Law alumni
People from Elkhart County, Indiana
Wabash College alumni